Shooting competitions at the 2023 Pan American Games in Santiago, Chile are scheduled to be held between October 21 and 27, 2023 at the Polígono de tiro de Pudahuel.

15 medal events are scheduled to be contested. Six for men, six for women and three mixed gender events. A total of 244 sport shooters will qualify to compete at the games.

The top shooter, not already qualified, in rifle and pistol individual events, together with the top two shooters, not already qualified, in shotgun individual events, will qualify for the 2024 Summer Olympics in Paris, France.

Qualification

A total of 244 sport shooters will qualify to compete. Each nation may enter a maximum of 24 athletes (two per each individual event). There will be three qualification events for shooters to qualify. There will be no quotas awarded for the mixed events, as nations must use already qualified athletes to compete in them. As host nation, Chile will get a quota of six athletes (two per each discipline, and can qualify more) and there will also be two wild cards awarded to nations not qualified.

Participating nations
A total of 20 countries qualified athletes.

Medal summary

Medalists
Men's events

Women's events

Mixed pairs events

See also
Shooting at the 2024 Summer Olympics

References

Events at the 2023 Pan American Games
Pan American Games
2023